Lorne Alistair Tennant, better known as Ali Tennant, is a British singer, songwriter and vocal producer/mentor from London signed to BMG Chrysalis.

Performer
Tennant released one album Crucial under the name Ali in 1998 on Polydor, and a single "Bitter Honey".

Songwriter
Beginning his songwriting career in 1998, he has had credits on 17 top ten albums, 7 of which hit number 1, as well as 4 singles, one of which debuted at number 1. Later years have seen Tennant vocal coach and produce for a number of high-profile clients such as The X Factor, The Voice UK, Jessie J (Alive), David Guetta (Nothing but the Beat), JLS (JLS, Outta This World, Jukebox, Evolution), the Saturdays (On Your Radar), Olly Murs (Olly Murs) and more.

Songwriting credits

Vocal coaching 
 The X Factor (2010)
 The Voice UK (2012–present)

References 

English male singers
Living people
English songwriters
British vocal coaches
Musicians from London
20th-century Black British male singers
Year of birth missing (living people)
British male songwriters